Il giudice Mastrangelo is an Italian crime-comedy television series.

Plot
Diego Abatantuono is judge (actually deputy attorney) Diego Mastrangelo, who has returned to his hometown, Lecce, after years of activity in the North. Together with him there is his sister Cristiana and the trusted driver Uelino, with whom he gives life to tasty gags, and the commissioner Federica Denza. Crime is at the center of the miniseries, with the cases that the judge will have to solve gradually.

Cast

Diego Abatantuono: Deputy attorney Diego Mastrangelo
Alessia Marcuzzi: Attorney Claudia Nicolai (season 2)
Antonio Catania: Uelino
Amanda Sandrelli: Commissioner Federica Denza
Luigi Maria Burruano: Attorney De Cesare
Vittoria Piancastelli: Cristiana Mastrangelo 
Dino Abbrescia: Gerardo 
Fabio Fulco: Commissioner Paolo Parsani (season 2)
Gennaro Diana: Inspector Naselli
Riccardo Zinna: Deputy attorney Frappampina
Elena Cantarone: Giuseppina Finzi
Ugo Conti: Palmieri

See also
List of Italian television series

References

External links
 

Italian television series
Italian legal television series
Canale 5 original programming